The Australian Defence Force (ADF) is the military organisation responsible for the defence of the Commonwealth of Australia and its national interests. It consists of the Royal Australian Navy (RAN), Australian Army, Royal Australian Air Force (RAAF) and several "tri-service" units. The ADF has a strength of just over 85,000 full-time personnel and active reservists and is supported by the Department of Defence and several other civilian agencies.

During the first decades of the 20th century, the Australian Government established the armed services as separate organisations. Each service had an independent chain of command. In 1976, the government made a strategic change and established the ADF to place the services under a single headquarters. Over time, the degree of integration has increased and tri-service headquarters, logistics, and training institutions have supplanted many single-service establishments.

The ADF is technologically sophisticated but relatively small. Although the ADF's 60,330 full-time active-duty personnel and 29,560 active reservists as of June 30th 2021 make it the largest military in Oceania, it is smaller than most Asian military forces. Nonetheless, the ADF is supported by a significant budget by worldwide standards and can deploy forces in multiple locations outside Australia.

Role

The ADF's legal standing draws on the executive government sections of the Australian Constitution. Section 51 (vi) gives the Commonwealth Government the power to make laws regarding Australia's defence and defence forces. Section 114 of the Constitution prevents the States from raising armed forces without the permission of the Commonwealth and Section 119 gives the Commonwealth responsibility for defending Australia from invasion and sets out the conditions under which the government can deploy the defence force domestically.

Section 68 of the Constitution sets out the ADF's command arrangements. The Section states that "the command in chief of the naval and military forces of the Commonwealth is vested in the Governor-General as the Queen's representative". In practice, the Governor-General does not play an active part in the ADF's command structure, and the elected government controls the ADF. The Minister for Defence and several subordinate ministers exercise this control. The Minister acts on most matters alone, though the National Security Committee of Cabinet considers important matters. The Minister then advises the Governor-General who acts as advised in the normal form of executive government. The Commonwealth Government has never been required by the Constitution or legislation to seek parliamentary approval for decisions to deploy military forces overseas or go to war.

The ADF's current priorities are set out in the 2016 Defence White Paper, which identifies three main areas of focus. The first of these is to defend Australia from direct attack or coercion. The second priority is to contribute to the security of Southeast Asia and the South Pacific. The third priority is to contribute to stability across the Indo-Pacific region and a "rules-based global order which supports our interests". The white paper states that the government will place equal weight on the three priorities when developing the ADF's capabilities.

History

Formation

Australia has maintained military forces since federation as a nation in January 1901. Shortly after federation, the Australian Government established the Australian Army and Commonwealth Naval Force by amalgamating the forces each of the states had maintained. In 1911, the Government established the Royal Australian Navy, which absorbed the Commonwealth Naval Force. The Army established the Australian Flying Corps in 1912 which was separated to form the Royal Australian Air Force in 1921. The services were not linked by a single chain of command, as they each reported to their own separate Minister and had separate administrative arrangements. The three services saw action around the world during World War I and World War II, and took part in conflicts in Asia during the Cold War.

The importance of 'joint' warfare was made clear to the Australian military during World War II when Australian naval, ground and air units frequently served as part of single commands. Following the war, several senior officers lobbied for the appointment of a commander in chief of the three services. The government rejected this proposal and the three services remained fully independent. The absence of a central authority resulted in poor coordination between the services, with each service organising and operating on the basis of a different military doctrine.

The need for an integrated command structure received more emphasis as a result of the inefficient arrangements which at times hindered the military's efforts during the Vietnam War. In 1973, the Secretary of the Department of Defence, Arthur Tange, submitted a report to the Government that recommended the unification of the separate departments supporting each service into a single Department of Defence and the creation of the post of Chief of the Defence Force Staff. The government accepted these recommendations and the Australian Defence Force was established on 9 February 1976.

Defence of Australia era

Until the 1970s, Australia's military strategy centred on the concept of 'forward defence', in which the role of the Australian military was to co-operate with allied forces to counter threats in Australia's region. In 1969, when the United States began the Guam Doctrine and the British withdrew 'east of Suez', Australia developed a defence policy which emphasised self-reliance and the defence of the Australian continent. This was known as the Defence of Australia Policy. Under this policy, the focus of Australian defence planning was to protect Australia's northern maritime approaches (the "Air-Sea Gap") against enemy attack. In line with this goal, the ADF was restructured to increase its ability to strike at enemy forces from Australian bases and to counter raids on continental Australia. The ADF achieved this by increasing the capabilities of the RAN and RAAF and relocating regular Army units to northern Australia.

At this time, the ADF had no military units on operational deployment outside Australia. In 1987, the ADF made its first operational deployment as part of Operation Morris Dance, in which several warships and a rifle company deployed to the waters off Fiji in response to the 1987 Fijian coups d'état. While broadly successful, this deployment highlighted the need for the ADF to improve its capability to rapidly respond to unforeseen events.

Since the late 1980s, the Government has increasingly called upon the ADF to contribute forces to peacekeeping missions around the world. While most of these deployments involved only small numbers of specialists, several led to the deployment of hundreds of personnel. Large peacekeeping deployments were made to Namibia in early 1989, Cambodia between 1992 and 1993, Somalia in 1993, Rwanda between 1994 and 1995 and Bougainville in 1994 and from 1997 onwards.

The Australian contribution to the 1991 Gulf War was the first time Australian personnel were deployed to an active war zone since the establishment of the ADF. Although the warships and clearance diving team deployed to the Persian Gulf did not see combat, the deployment tested the ADF's capabilities and command structure. Following the war the Navy regularly deployed a frigate to the Persian Gulf or Red Sea to enforce the trade sanctions imposed on Iraq.

East Timor deployment

In 1996, John Howard led the Liberal Party's election campaign and became Prime Minister. Subsequently, there were significant reforms to the ADF's force structure and role. The new government's defence strategy placed less emphasis on defending Australia from direct attack and greater emphasis on working in co-operation with regional states and Australia's allies to manage potential security threats. From 1997 the Government also implemented a series of changes to the ADF's force structure in an attempt to increase the proportion of combat units to support units and improve the ADF's combat effectiveness.

The ADF's experiences during the deployment to East Timor in 1999 led to significant changes in Australia's defence policies and to an enhancement of the ADF's ability to conduct operations outside Australia. This successful deployment was the first time a large ADF force had operated outside of Australia since the Vietnam War, and revealed shortcomings in its ability to mount and sustain such operations.

In 2000, the Government released a new Defence White Paper, Defence 2000 – Our Future Defence Force, that placed a greater emphasis on preparing the ADF for overseas deployments. The Government committed to improve the ADF's capabilities by improving the readiness and equipment of ADF units, expanding the ADF and increasing real Defence expenditure by 3% per year; in the event, expenditure increased by 2.3% per annum in real terms in the period to 2012–13. In 2003 and 2005, the Defence Updates emphasised this focus on expeditionary operations and led to an expansion and modernisation of the ADF.

Iraq and Afghanistan
Since 2000, the ADF's expanded force structure and deployment capabilities have been put to the test on several occasions. Following the 11 September 2001 terrorist attacks on the United States, Australia committed a special forces task group and an air-to-air refuelling aircraft to operations in Afghanistan, and naval warships to the Persian Gulf as Operation Slipper. In 2003, approximately 2,000 ADF personnel, including a special forces task group, three warships and 14 F/A-18 Hornet aircraft, took part in the invasion of Iraq.

The ADF was subsequently involved in the reconstruction of Iraq. From 2003 until 2005 this was mainly limited to a Security Detachment which protected the Australian embassy, the attachment of officers to multi-national headquarters, small numbers of transport and maritime patrol aircraft, and teams of air traffic controllers and medical personnel. From 2005 until 2008 a battalion-sized Australian Army battle group (initially designated the Al Muthanna Task Group, and later Overwatch Battle Group (West)) was stationed in southern Iraq. In addition, teams of ADF personnel were deployed to train Iraqi military units. In line with a 2007 election commitment, the Rudd Government withdrew combat-related forces from Iraq in mid-2008, and most of the remaining Australian units left the country the next year.

The ADF also undertook several operations in Australia's immediate region during the 2000s. In 2003, elements of all three services were dispatched to the Solomon Islands as part of the Regional Assistance Mission to the Solomon Islands. Regular deployments of Australian forces continued to the islands until 2017. Between December 2004 and March 2005, 1,400 ADF personnel served in Indonesia as part of Operation Sumatra Assist, which formed part of Australia's response to the devastating 2004 Indian Ocean earthquake. In May 2006, approximately 2,000 ADF personnel deployed to East Timor in Operation Astute following unrest between elements of the Timor Leste Defence Force. This deployment concluded in March 2013.

From 2006 until 2013 a battalion-sized Australian Army task force operated in Urozgan Province, Afghanistan; this unit was primarily tasked with providing assistance for reconstruction efforts and training Afghan forces, but was frequently involved in combat. In addition, Special Forces Task Groups were deployed from 2005 to 2006 and 2007 until 2013. Other specialist elements of the ADF, including detachments of CH-47 Chinook helicopters and RAAF radar and air traffic control units, were also periodically deployed to the country. A total of 40 ADF personnel were killed in Afghanistan between 2002 and 2013, and 262 wounded. Following the withdrawal of the combat forces in 2013, ADF training teams have continued to be stationed in the country to train Afghan forces.

The Australian Labor Party (ALP) governments led by Prime Ministers Rudd and Julia Gillard between 2007 and 2013 commissioned two defence white papers, which were published in 2009 and 2013. The 2009 document, Defending Australia in the Asia Pacific Century: Force 2030, had a focus on responding to China's rapidly growing influence. It included commitments to expand the RAN, including acquiring twelve submarines, and increasing defence spending by three percent per year in real terms. This increase in spending did not occur, however. The Defence White Paper 2013 had similar strategic themes, but set out a more modest program of defence spending which reflected the government's constrained finances. As part of an election commitment, the  Liberal–National Coalition Abbott Government commissioned a further defence white paper that was published in 2016. This document also included a commitment to expand the ADF's size and capabilities. There has generally been bipartisan agreement between the ALP and the Liberal–National Coalition on the ADF's role since the mid-1970s. Both political groupings currently support the ADF's focus on expeditionary operations, and the broad funding target set out in the 2016 Defence White Paper. The ADF's broad force structure has also experienced little change since the 1980s. For instance, throughout this period the Army's main combat formations have been three brigades and the RAAF has been equipped with around 100 combat aircraft. Most of the equipment used by the services has been replaced or upgraded, however.

It is stated in the 2016 Defence White Paper that Australia's changing security environment will lead to new demands being placed on the Australian Defence Force. Although it is not expected that Australia will face any threat of direct attack from another country, terrorist groups and tensions between nations in East Asia pose threats to Australian security. More broadly, the Australian Government believes that it needs to make a contribution to maintaining the rules-based order globally. There is also a risk that climate change, weak economic growth and social factors could cause instability in South Pacific countries.

The ADF has developed strategies to respond to Australia's changing strategic environment. The 2016 Defence White Paper states that "the Government will ensure Australia maintains a regionally superior ADF
with the highest levels of military capability and scientific and technological sophistication". To this end, the government intends to improve the ADF's combat power and expand the number of military personnel. This will include introducing new technologies and capabilities. The ADF is also seeking to improve its intelligence capabilities and co-operation between the services.

2017–present

In December 2017, 2,350 ADF personnel were deployed on operations in Australian territory and overseas.

The ADF currently has several forces deployed to the Middle East. The ADF's contribution to the Military intervention against ISIL makes up the largest overseas commitment with 780 personnel deployed as part of Operation Okra. As of December 2017, six F/A-18F Super Hornets, one E-7A Wedgetail and one KC-30A tanker were deployed to strike Islamic State targets in Iraq and Syria. Approximately 300 personnel were deployed to Iraq as part of an international effort to provide training to the Iraqi security forces and a further 80 were in the country as part of a Special Operations Task Group. At this time the Super Hornets were scheduled to return to Australia without replacement during January 2018. Deployments in Afghanistan number 270 personnel in Operation Highroad, a non-combat training mission supporting the Afghan National Army. A frigate is also deployed to the Middle East in maritime security operations in and around the Gulf of Aden as part of the Combined Maritime Forces. Small parties of Australian personnel also form part of peacekeeping missions in Israel, Jordan, Egypt and Sudan. The ADF has a further 500 personnel based in the Middle East to support operations in the region.

The ADF continues to play a role in the United Nations Command in Korea via commanding the UNC-Rear logistics element in Japan. As part of Operation Argos, warships and aircraft have also been periodically deployed to North Asia since 2018 to contribute to the enforcement of sanctions against North Korea.

Australian military units are also deployed on operations in Australia's immediate region. As of December 2017, 500 personnel were deployed on Australia's northern approaches in maritime security operations, forming Operation Resolute. ADF units undertake periodic deployments in the South China Sea and South West Pacific. Since October 2017 over 80 Australian soldiers have been deployed to the Philippines to provide training for the Armed Forces of the Philippines. RAN patrol boats and RAAF maritime patrol aircraft have also been deployed to the Philippines. This deployment may involve the Australian Secret Intelligence Service, and form a continuation of secretive ADF counter-terrorism operations in the Middle East.

Structure

The Australian Defence Force and Department of Defence make up the Australian Defence Organisation (ADO), which is often referred to as "Defence". A diarchy of the Chief of the Defence Force (CDF) and the Secretary of the Department of Defence administers the ADO. The Department of Defence is staffed by both civilian and military personnel, and includes agencies such as the Defence Intelligence Organisation (DIO) and Defence Science and Technology Group (DST Group).

Command arrangements

The ADF's command arrangements are specified in the Defence Act (1903) and subordinate legislation. This act states that the Minister for Defence "shall have the general control and administration of the Defence Force" and that the CDF, the Secretary of the Department of Defence and the chiefs of the three services must act "in accordance with any directions of the Minister". The leaders of the ADO are also responsible to the junior ministers who are appointed to manage specific elements of the defence portfolio. Under the Albanese Ministry two cabinet-level ministers have been responsible for the Defence portfolio since May 2022: the position of Minister for Defence held by the Deputy Prime Minister Richard Marles, and Matt Keogh is the Minister for Defence Personnel and the Minister for Veterans' Affairs. In addition, there are two junior ministers: Matt Thistlethwaite is the Assistant Minister for Defence and Assistant Minister for Veterans' Affairs and Pat Conroy is the Minister for Defence Industry.

The CDF is the most senior appointment in the ADF and commands the force. The CDF is the only four-star officer in the ADF and is a general, admiral or air chief marshal. As well as having command responsibilities, the CDF is the Minister for Defence's principal military adviser. General Angus Campbell is the current CDF, and assumed this position on 1 July 2018. Hugh White, a prominent academic and former Deputy Secretary in the Department of Defence, has criticised the ADF's current command structure. White argues that the Minister plays too large a role in military decision-making and does not provide the CDF and Secretary of Defence with necessary and sufficient authority to manage the ADO effectively.

Under the current ADF command structure the day-to-day management of the ADF is distinct from the command of military operations. The services are administered through the ADO, with the head of each service (the Chief of Navy, Chief of Army and Chief of Air Force) and the service headquarters being responsible for raising, training and sustaining combat forces. Each chief is also the CDF's principal adviser on matters concerning the responsibilities of their service. The CDF chairs the Chiefs of Service Committee which comprises the service chiefs, Vice Chief of the Defence Force and the Chief of Joint Operations (CJOPS). The CDF and service chiefs are supported by an integrated ADF Headquarters, which replaced separate service headquarters on 1 July 2017.

While the individual members of each service ultimately report to their service's Chief, the Chiefs do not control military operations. Control of ADF operations is exercised through a formal command chain headed by the CJOPS, who reports directly to the CDF. The CJOPS commands the Headquarters Joint Operations Command (HQJOC) as well as temporary joint task forces. These joint task forces comprise units assigned from their service to participate in operations or training exercises.

Joint forces

Operational command of the ADF is exercised by HQJOC, which is located at a purpose-built facility near Bungendore, New South Wales. This is a 'joint' headquarters comprising personnel from the three services and includes a continuously manned Joint Control Centre. HQJOC's main role is to "plan, monitor and control" ADF operations and exercises, and it is organised around groups of plans, operations and support staff. HQJOC also monitors the readiness of the ADF units which are not assigned to operations and contributes to developing Australia's military doctrine.

As well as HQJOC, the ADF has permanent joint operational commands responsible to the CJOPS. Joint Operations Command (JOC) includes the two headquarters responsible for patrolling Australia's maritime borders on a day-to-day basis, Northern Command and Maritime Border Command. Other JOC units include the Joint Movements Group and the Air and Space Operations Centre. Individual ADF units and Joint Task Groups are assigned to JOC during operations, and HQJOC includes officers responsible for submarine and special operations forces.

The ADF includes a number of joint operational and training units. These include the Joint Military Police Unit and the Joint Helicopter Aircrew Training School.

Royal Australian Navy

The Royal Australian Navy is the naval branch of the Australian Defence Force. The RAN operates just under 50 commissioned warships, including destroyers, frigates, submarines, patrol boats and auxiliary ships, as well as a number of non-commissioned vessels. In addition, the RAN maintains a force of combat, logistics and training helicopters.

There are two parts to the RAN's structure. One is an operational command, Fleet Command, and the other is a support command, Navy Strategic Command. The Navy's assets are administered by five 'forces' which report to the Commander Australian Fleet. These are the Fleet Air Arm, the Mine Warfare, Clearance Diving, Hydrographic, Meteorological and Patrol Force, Shore Force, Submarine Force and Surface Force.

Australian Army

The Army is organised into three main elements which report to the Chief of Army; the Headquarters of the 1st Division, Special Operations Command and Forces Command. As of 2017, approximately 85% of Army personnel were in units assigned to Forces Command, which is responsible for preparing units and individuals for operations. Headquarters 1st Division is responsible for high-level training activities and is capable of being deployed to command large scale ground operations. Only a small number of units are permanently assigned to the 1st Division; these include the 2nd Battalion, Royal Australian Regiment which forms the pre-landing force for the Australian Amphibious Force, a signals regiment and three training and personnel support units.

The Australian Army's main combat forces are grouped in brigades. Its main conventional forces are three regular combat brigades which are organised on a common structure; the 1st, 3rd and 7th Brigades. Support for the units in these formations is provided by an aviation brigade (16th Aviation Brigade), a combat support and ISTAR brigade (6th Brigade) and a logistics brigade (the 17th Sustainment Brigade). Under a restructure of the Army's health capability, a new health brigade, designated the 2nd Health Brigade, will be raised in 2023. In addition, there are six Army Reserve brigades; these brigades are administered by the 2nd Division and "paired" with the three regular combat brigades. The Army's main tactical formations are combined arms battlegroups made up of elements drawn from different units.

The Special Operations Command commands the Army's special forces units. It comprises the Special Air Service Regiment, the 2nd Commando Regiment, the reserve 1st Commando Regiment and the Special Operations Engineer Regiment as well as logistics and training units. The Army's special forces units have been expanded since 2001 and are well equipped and capable of being deployed by sea, air or land. As of 2014, Special Operations Command comprised approximately 2,200 personnel.

Royal Australian Air Force

The Royal Australian Air Force (RAAF) is the air power branch of the ADF. The RAAF has modern combat and transport aircraft and a network of bases in strategic locations across Australia.

The RAAF has a single operational command, Air Command. Air Command is the operational arm of the RAAF and consists of Air Combat Group, Air Mobility Group, Surveillance and Response Group, Combat Support Group, Air Warfare Centre and Air Force Training Group. Each group consists of several wings.

The RAAF has nineteen flying squadrons; five combat squadrons, two maritime patrol squadrons, six transport squadrons, six training squadrons (including three Operational Conversion Units and a forward air control training squadron) as well as one Airborne Early Warning & Control squadron and a Joint Terminal Attack Controller squadron. The ground units supporting these flying squadrons include three expeditionary combat support squadrons, three security force squadrons and a range of intelligence, air traffic control, communications, radar and medical units.

Logistic support

The ADF's logistics are managed by the Department of Defence's Capability Acquisition and Sustainment Group (CASG). The CASG was established in 2015 from the previously semi-independent Defence Materiel Organisation. The CASG is responsible for purchasing all forms of equipment and services used by the ADF and maintaining this equipment throughout its life of type.

The CASG is not responsible for directly supplying deployed ADF units; this is the responsibility of the Joint Logistics Command (JLC) and the single service logistic units. These units include the Navy's Strategic Command and replenishment ships, the Army's 17th Sustainment Brigade and Combat Service Support Battalions, and the Combat Support Group RAAF.

The ADF maintains stockpiles of ammunition, fuel and other supplies. Since the late 1990s, ammunition for the three services has been stored in a network of facilities managed by the JLC. The ADF also holds several months' worth of fuel for the Navy's vessels and several weeks' worth for aircraft and vehicles. A number of defence analysts have raised concerns over the adequacy of the fuel stockpile, especially as Australia is largely dependent on imports which could be disrupted in the event of war.

The increasing role of the private sector forms an important trend in the ADF's logistics arrangements. During the 1990s many of the ADF's support functions were transferred to the private sector to improve the efficiency with which they were provided. Since these reforms most of the 'garrison' support services at military bases have been provided by private firms. The reforms also led to many of the ADF's logistics units being disbanded or reduced in size. Since this time private firms have increasingly been contracted to provide critical support to ADF units deployed outside Australia. This support has included transporting equipment and personnel and constructing and supplying bases.

Military intelligence and surveillance

The Australian Defence Force's intelligence collection and analysis capabilities include each of the services' intelligence systems and units, two joint civilian-military intelligence gathering agencies and two strategic and operational-level intelligence analysis organisations.

Each of the three services has its own intelligence collection assets. RAN doctrine stresses the importance of collecting a wide range of information, and combining it to inform decisions. It also notes that the Collins-class submarines are particularly effective sources of "acoustic, electromagnetic and environmental information". The Army's intelligence and surveillance units include the 1st Intelligence Battalion, 7th Signal Regiment (Electronic Warfare), 20th Surveillance and Target Acquisition Regiment, three Regional Force Surveillance Units and the Special Air Service Regiment. The RAAF monitors the airspace of Australia and neighbouring countries using the Vigilare system, which combines input from the service's Jindalee Operational Radar Network, other ADF air defence radars (including airborne and naval systems) and civilian air traffic control radars. The RAAF's other intelligence assets include No. 87 Squadron and the AP-3C Orion aircraft operated by No. 92 Wing. A C band radar and a telescope located at Naval Communication Station Harold E. Holt provide a space situational awareness capability, which includes tracking space assets and debris. Australia also provides personnel to the US Joint Space Operations Center in Colorado Springs which tracks and identifies any man-made object in orbit.

The Defence Strategic Policy and Intelligence Group within the Department of Defence supports the services and co-operates with the civilian agencies within the Australian Intelligence Community. This Group consists of the Australian Geospatial-Intelligence Organisation (AGO), Australian Signals Directorate (ASD) and Defence Intelligence Organisation (DIO). The AGO is responsible for geospatial intelligence and producing maps for the ADF, the ASD is Australia's signals intelligence agency, and the DIO is responsible for the analysis of intelligence collected by the other intelligence agencies. The three agencies are headquartered in Canberra, though the AGO has staff in Bendigo and the ASD maintains several permanent signals collection facilities in other locations.

The ASD also includes the Australian Cyber Security Centre (ACSC) which is responsible for protecting Defence and other Australian Government agencies against cyberwarfare attacks. The ACSC was established in January 2010 and is jointly staffed by the ASD and personnel from the Attorney-General's Department, Australian Security Intelligence Organisation, and Australian Federal Police. Unlike the United States military, the ADF does not class cyberwarfare as being a separate sphere of warfare. In July 2017 an Information Warfare Division was raised, tasked with both defensive and offensive cyber operations.

The Australian Secret Intelligence Service (ASIS) has been involved in ADF operations since the Vietnam War including East Timor, Iraq and Afghanistan.  In 2012, the Director-General of ASIS stated that the service's agents had saved the lives of Australian soldiers, enabled special forces operations and that "it's difficult to see a situation in the future where the ADF would deploy without ASIS alongside". It has been reported that one of the Special Air Service Regiment's squadrons works with ASIS and has undertaken independent covert intelligence-collection operations outside Australia.

Personnel

The Australian military has been an all-volunteer force since the abolition of conscription in 1972. Both men and women can enlist in the ADF, with women being able to apply for all roles. Only Australian citizens and permanent residents who are eligible for Australian citizenship can enlist. Recruits must be aged at least 17, and meet health, educational and aptitude standards. The ADF is one of the few areas of the Australian Government to continue to have compulsory retirement ages: permanent personnel must retire at 60 years of age and reservists at 65. Both permanent and reserve personnel can work through flexible arrangements, including part-time hours or remotely from their duty station, subject to approval. Discipline of defence personnel is guided by the Defence Force Discipline Act (1982), ultimately overseen by the Judge Advocate General of the ADF.

Australian demographic trends will put pressure on the ADF in the future. Excluding other factors, the ageing of the Australian population will result in smaller numbers of potential recruits entering the Australian labour market each year. Some predictions are that population ageing will result in slower economic growth and increased government expenditure on pensions and health programs. As a result of these trends, the ageing of Australia's population may worsen the ADF's manpower situation and may force the Government to reallocate some of the Defence budget. Few young Australians consider joining the military and the ADF has to compete for recruits against private sector firms which are able to offer higher salaries.

Personnel numbers
As of 30 June 2020, the ADF comprised 59,095 permanent (full-time) and 28,878 active reserve (part-time) personnel. There were 22,166 inactive members of the Standby Reserve as at June 2009. The Army is the largest service, followed by the RAAF and RAN. The ADO also employed 17,454 civilian Australian Public Service (APS) staff as at 30 June 2020. During the 2019–20 financial year 6,277 people enlisted in the ADF on a permanent basis and 5,240 left, representing a net increase of 1,037 personnel.

The distribution of ADF personnel between the services and categories of service on 30 June 2020 was as follows:

The number of ADF personnel has changed over the last 20 years. During the 1990s the strength of the ADF was reduced from around 70,000 to 50,000 permanent personnel as a result of budget cuts and the outsourcing of some military functions. The ADF began to grow from 2000 after the defence white paper released that year called for an expansion to the military's strength, though the size of the military decreased between the 2003–04 to 2005–06 financial years due to problems with attracting further recruits. By 2009–10 the ADF was above its budgeted size, leading to reductions until 2014–15. The size of the ADF grew between the 2014–15 and 2016–17 financial years. The ADF has not met its recruitment targets over the period since the 1995–96 financial year.

In March 2022 Prime Minister Scott Morrison announced that by 2040 the strength of the ADF would grow by around 30% to be almost 80,000 permanent personnel. The expansion is estimated to cost at least A$38 billion which includes increasing the number of APS personnel.

The ADF is small compared to many other national militaries. Both the number of personnel in the ADF and the share of the Australian population this represents is smaller than that in many countries in Australia's immediate region. Several NATO member countries, including France and the United States, also have a higher share of their population in the military. This is a continuation of long-term trends, as outside of major wars Australia has always had a relatively small military. The size of the force is a result of Australia's relatively small population and the military being structured around a maritime strategy focused on the RAN and RAAF rather than a manpower-intensive army.

Reserves

Each of the branches of the ADF has a reserve component. These forces are the Royal Australian Naval Reserve, Australian Army Reserve and Royal Australian Air Force Reserve. The main role of the reserves is to supplement the permanent elements of the ADF during deployments and crises, including natural disasters. This can include attaching individual reservists to regular units or deploying units composed entirely of reserve personnel. As reservists serve on a part-time basis, they are less costly to the government than permanent members of the ADF, but the nature of their service can mean that reservists have a lower level of readiness than regular personnel and require further training before they can be deployed. It has historically proven difficult to set a level of training requirements which allows reservists to be rapidly deployable yet does not act as a disincentive to recruitment and continued participation. Successive governments since the 1960s have also been reluctant to use the 'call out' powers to require reservists to undertake active service.

There are two main categories of reserve personnel; those in the active reserve and those in the standby reserve. Members of the active reserve have an annual minimum training obligation. Reservists can volunteer to undertake more than the minimum periods of training and active service. Members of the standby reserve are not required to undertake training, and would only be called up in response to a national emergency or to fill a specialised position. Most standby reservists are former full-time members of the ADF.

While Australian Naval Reserve personnel are assigned to permanent units, most members of the Army Reserve and Air Force Reserve are members of reserve units. Most of the RAAF's reserve units are not intended to be deployed, and reserve personnel are generally attached to regular air force units during their periods of active service. The Army Reserve is organised into permanent combat and support units, though most are currently manned at levels well below their authorised strengths and are not capable of deploying as formed units.

The ADF's increased activities since 1999 and shortfalls in recruiting permanent personnel has led to reservists being more frequently called to active service. This has included large scale domestic deployments, which have included providing security for major events such as the 2000 Summer Olympics and responding to natural disasters. Large numbers of reserve personnel have also been deployed as part of ADF operations in Australia's region; this has included the deployment of Army Reserve rifle companies to East Timor and the Solomon Islands. Smaller numbers of reservists have taken part in operations in locations distant from Australia. Notably, companies of the Army Reserve 1st Commando Regiment were regularly deployed to Afghanistan as part of the Special Operations Task Group.

Training

Individual training of Australian servicemen and women is generally provided by the services in their own training institutions. Each service has its own training organisation to manage this individual training. Where possible, however, individual training is increasingly being provided through tri-service schools.

Military academies include  for the Navy, Royal Military College, Duntroon, for the Army, and the Officers' Training School for the Air Force. The Australian Defence Force Academy is a tri-service university for officer cadets of all services who wish to attain a university degree through the ADF.

Women in the ADF

Women first served in the Australian military during World War II when each service established a separate female branch. The RAAF was the first service to fully integrate women into operational units, doing so in 1977, with the Army and RAN following in 1979 and 1985 respectively. The ADF initially struggled to integrate women, with integration being driven by changing Australian social values and Government legislation rather than a change in attitudes within the male-dominated military.

The number of positions available to women in the ADF has increased over time. Although servicewomen were initially barred from combat positions, these restrictions began to be lifted in 1990. In September 2011 Minister for Defence Stephen Smith announced that the Cabinet had decided to remove all restrictions on women serving in combat positions, and that this change would come into effect within five years. This decision was supported by the CDF and the chiefs of the services. Serving women became able to apply for all positions on 1 January 2013 except special forces roles in the Army which became open to women in January 2014. In January 2016, civilian women became able to be directly recruited to all positions.

Despite the expansion in the number of positions available to women and other changes which aim to encourage increased female recruitment and retention, the growth in the proportion of female permanent defence personnel has been slow. In the 1989–1990 financial year women made up 11.4% of the ADF personnel. In the 2008–2009 financial year women occupied 13.5% of ADF positions. During the same period the proportion of civilian positions filled by women in the Australian Defence Organisation increased from 30.8% to 42.8%. In 2017–2018, women made up 17.9% of the ADF's permanent force. The proportion of women in the permanent force differs by service: 14.3% of members of the Army are female, compared to 21.5% of the RAN and 22.1% for the RAAF. In 2015 the ADF adopted targets to increase the proportion of service personnel who are female by 2023: by this time it is planned that women will make up 25% of the RAN, 15% of the Army and 25% of the RAAF.

There continue to be concerns over the incidence of sexual abuse and gender-based discrimination in the ADF. In 2014 the Defence Abuse Response Taskforce estimated that around 1,100 currently-serving ADF personnel had abused other members of the military, and recommended that a royal commission be conducted to investigate long-running allegations of sexual abuse and assault of servicewomen at the Australian Defence Force Academy. In 2013 Chief of Army General David Morrison publicly released a video in which he warned against gender-based discrimination, and stated that he would dismiss members of the Army who engaged in such conduct.

Ethnic and religious composition

A high percentage of ADF personnel are drawn from the Anglo-Celtic portion of Australia's population. In 2011 the proportion of ADF personnel born in Australia and the other predominately Anglo-Celtic countries was higher than this population group's share of both the Australian workforce and overall population. As a result, analyst Mark Thomson has argued that the ADF is unrepresentative of Australia's society in this regard and that recruiting more personnel from other ethnic backgrounds would improve the ADF's language skills and cultural empathy. In 2013, the ADF launched the Defence Diversity and Inclusion Strategy 2012-2017 to recruit more volunteers from culturally and linguistically diverse backgrounds and to improve statistics collection.

On 30 June 2020, 3.2% of ADF permanent personnel and 2.6% of Reserves were Indigenous Australians. The Defence Reconciliation Action Plan 2019-2022 aims to increase the number of Indigenous Australians the ADF recruits and to improve their retention rate, and has set a target of 5% Indigenous representation by 2025. Restrictions on Indigenous Australians' ability to enlist in the military existed until the 1970s, though hundreds of Indigenous men and women had joined the military when restrictions were reduced during the world wars. By 1992 the representation of Indigenous Australians in the ADF was equivalent to their proportion of the Australian population, though they continue to be under-represented among the officer corps. Two of the Army's three Regional Force Surveillance Units (NORFORCE and the 51st Battalion, Far North Queensland Regiment) are manned mostly by Indigenous Australian reservists. In 2015 Indigenous Australians made up around 2% of ADF personnel, which was smaller than the Indigenous share of the total Australian population.

In line with trends across the broader Australian population, the proportion of ADF personnel who are not religious has increased considerably over recent years. The proportion of ADF personnel who reported that their religion was Christianity in service censuses and human relations databases decreased from around 66% in 2003 to just over 52% in 2015. Over this period, the proportion who stated that they do not have a religious affiliation increased from 31% to 47%. Only 1% of ADF members reported having a non-Christian religious affiliation in 2015.

Sexuality and gender identity

Australia allows gay men and lesbians to serve openly. Openly gay and lesbian personnel were banned from the ADF until November 1992 when the Australian Government decided to remove this prohibition. The heads of the services and most military personnel opposed this change at the time, and it caused considerable public debate. Opponents of lifting the ban on gay and lesbian personnel argued that doing so would greatly harm the ADF's cohesiveness and cause large numbers of resignations. This did not eventuate, and the reform caused few problems. A 2000 study found that lifting the ban on gay service did not have any negative effects on the ADF's morale, effectiveness or recruitment and retention, and may have led to increased productivity and improved working environments. Few members of the ADF came out as lesbian, gay or bisexual until the late 1990s, however, and those who did were not always welcomed by their comrades.

ADF personnel in same-sex relationships experienced discriminatory treatment until the 2000s. This included Defence not recognising same-sex spouses, which prevented these couples from receiving the financial entitlements available to opposite-sex couples and could be a barrier to the spouse being treated as their partner's next of kin. The ADF officially recognised same-sex relationships in 2005, and since 1 January 2009 these couples have had the same access to military retirement pensions and superannuation as opposite-sex couples. Transgender personnel have been permitted to serve in the ADF since 2010, and are provided with support when necessary. Despite the removal of restrictions on gay and lesbian personnel, harassment and discrimination continued to occur; for instance a 2013 survey found that 10% of gay soldiers had experienced discrimination and more than 30% hid their sexuality. The ADF has actively encouraged the inclusion of LGBTI personnel since the mid-2010s, with its leadership highlighting the importance of the issue and the military justice system being strongly used to prevent harassment and discrimination. Defence Force Recruiting also encourages LGBTI people to enlist. As of 2023, 4.8 percent of ADF personnel identified as members of the LGBTI+ community.

Defence expenditure and procurement

Current expenditure

The Australian Government allocated  to the Australian Defence Organisation in the 2017–18 financial year. This level of expenditure is equivalent to approximately 1.9% of Australian Gross Domestic Product (GDP) and 7.28% of total Australian Government expenditure. This was an increase in nominal terms from the  allocated in the 2016–17 financial year which represented approximately 1.83% of GDP. In broad terms the Defence budget is divided into expenditure on personnel, operating costs and capital investment; in 2016–17 37% of expenditure was on personnel, 36% on operational costs and 27% on capital investments.

Australia's defence expenditure is much larger in dollar terms to that of most countries in Australia's immediate region. The share of GDP Australia spends on defence is also larger than that in most developed economies and major South-East Asian countries. China allocates approximately the same proportion of GDP to Defence as Australia does, and has been rapidly increasing its nominal expenditure. The Stockholm International Peace Research Institute has estimated that Australia's defence spending in 2017 was the 13th highest of any country in real terms. As a proportion of GDP Australia's defence spending ranks as 49th of the countries for which data is available.

Long term procurement projects

The 2016–17 budget forecasts that defence expenditure will increase to $42 billion in 2020–21, which is estimated to represent 2.03% of GDP. This reflects a bipartisan commitment to increase defence expenditure to 2% of GDP. The 2016 Defence White Paper included a commitment to further increases in spending beyond this time, with nominal expenditure being projected to be around $58.8 billion in 2020–25; the Australian Strategic Policy Institute has estimated that this would represent about 2.16% of GDP.

The Integrated Investment Program that was released alongside the 2016 Defence White Paper sets out the ADF's long term capital programs. This document is the successor to the Defence Capability Plans which were regularly produced from 2000. The total value of the projects in the Integrated Investment Program over the period to 2025–26 is $162 billion.

Equipment

The ADF seeks to be a high-technology force. Although most of the ADF's weapons are only used by single service, there is an increasing emphasis on commonality. The three services use the same small arms and the FN Herstal 35 is the ADF's standard hand gun, the F88 Austeyr the standard rifle, the F89 Minimi the standard light support weapon, the FN Herstal MAG-58 the standard light machine gun and the Browning M2HB the standard heavy machine gun.

The ADF is equipped with conventional weapons only. Australia does not possess weapons of mass destruction and has ratified the Biological Weapons Convention, Chemical Weapons Convention and Nuclear Non-Proliferation Treaty. Australia is also a party to international agreements which prohibit land mines and cluster munitions.

As of October 2019, the Royal Australian Navy operates 45 ships and submarines. The Navy's main surface combatants are eight Anzac-class frigates and three Hobart-class destroyers. The RAN's submarine force has six Collins-class submarines. There are 13 Armidale-class patrol boats for border security and fisheries patrol duties in Australia's northern waters. The RAN's amphibious force comprises the two Canberra-class landing helicopter docks and the dock landing ship . The Navy's minesweeping force is equipped with four Huon-class minehunters. The replenishment vessel  and six survey vessels (the Leeuwin and Paluma classes) support these combatants. Non-commissioned ships operated by the RAN include the sail training ship Young Endeavour and two Cape-class patrol boats leased to the RAN from the Australian Border Force. As of October 2017, the Fleet Air Arm's helicopter force comprised 24 MH-60R Seahawk and 3 S-70 Seahawk anti-submarine helicopters, 7 MRH 90 transport helicopters and a training force equipped with 15 EC 135T2+ and 4 Bell 429s. The S-70 and Squirrel helicopters were retired in December 2017. The RAN plans to acquire nuclear submarines (and other weapons) as part of the AUKUS agreement.

The Australian Army is equipped with a wide range of equipment in order to be able to employ combined arms approaches in combat. , the Army's armoured fighting vehicle holdings included 59 M1A1 Abrams main battle tanks, 1,426 M113 armoured personnel carriers (of which 431 had been upgraded, with many of the remainder being placed in reserve), and 253 ASLAV armoured reconnaissance vehicles. A total of 995 Bushmaster Protected Mobility Vehicles were in service with more on order. The Army's artillery holdings consisted of 54 155 mm towed M777 howitzers, 188 81 mm mortars, RBS-70 surface-to-air missiles and FGM-148 Javelin anti-tank missiles. As of October 2017, Australian Army Aviation operated over 100 helicopters. These included  including 23 Kiowa reconnaissance and training helicopters and 22 Eurocopter Tiger armed reconnaissance helicopters, as well as 33 S-70A-9 Blackhawk, 10 CH-47F Chinook and 40 MRH 90 transport helicopters. The Army also operated 10 RQ-7B Shadow 2000 unmanned aerial vehicles in 2016. The Army's fleet of watercraft at this time included 13 LCM-8 landing craft.

The Royal Australian Air Force operates combat, maritime patrol, transport and training aircraft. As 2022 the combat aircraft force comprised 24 F/A-18F Super Hornets, 11 EA-18G Growlers, with one on order and 54 F-35A Lightning IIs with another 18 on order. The Intelligence, surveillance and reconnaissance force was equipped with 2 AP-3C Orion and 12 P-8 Poseidon maritime patrol aircraft, with 2 on order as well as 6 E-7A Wedgetail AEW&C aircraft. The air transport force operated 12 C-130J-30 Super Hercules, 8 C-17 Globemaster IIIs and 10 C-27J Spartans. A further 16 Super King Air 350s were used in both the transport and training roles. The RAAF also operates 3 Challenger and 2 Boeing 737 aircraft as VIP transports. A total of six KC-30 Multi-Role Tanker Transports were in service with another on order. The RAAF's training units were equipped with  49 PC-21s and 33 Hawk 127s. In October 2022 the RAAF received its first MQ-4C with a further 6 on order, and plans to acquire 6 MQ-28 Ghost Bat UCAV

Bases

The Australian Defence Force maintains 60 major bases and many other facilities across all the states and territories of Australia. These bases occupy millions of hectares of land, giving the ADO Australia's largest real estate portfolio. Defence Housing Australia manages around 19,000 residences occupied by members of the ADF. While most of the Army's permanent force units are based in northern Australia, the majority of Navy and Air Force units are based near Sydney, Brisbane and Perth. Few ADF bases are currently shared by different services. Small Army and RAAF units are also located at Royal Malaysian Air Force Base Butterworth. The administrative headquarters of the ADF and the three services is located in Canberra alongside the main offices of the Department of Defence.

The Royal Australian Navy has two main bases; Fleet Base East (HMAS Kuttabul) in Sydney and Fleet Base West (HMAS Stirling) near Perth. The Navy's operational headquarters, Fleet Headquarters, is located adjacent to Fleet Base East. The Fleet Air Arm is based at  near Nowra, New South Wales.

The Australian Army's regular units are concentrated in a few bases, most of which are located in Australia's northern states. The Army's operational headquarters, Forces Command, is located at Victoria Barracks in Sydney. Most elements of the Army's three regular brigades are based at Robertson Barracks near Darwin, Lavarack Barracks in Townsville, Queensland, and Gallipoli Barracks in Brisbane. The 1st Division's Headquarters is also located at Gallipoli Barracks. Other important Army bases include the Army Aviation Centre near Oakey, Queensland, Holsworthy Barracks near Sydney, Woodside Barracks near Adelaide, South Australia, and Campbell Barracks in Perth. Dozens of Army Reserve depots are located across Australia.

The Royal Australian Air Force maintains several air bases, including three which are only occasionally activated. The RAAF's operational headquarters, Air Command, is located at RAAF Base Glenbrook near Sydney. The Air Force's combat aircraft are based at RAAF Base Amberley near Ipswich, Queensland, RAAF Base Tindal near Katherine, Northern Territory, and RAAF Base Williamtown near Newcastle, New South Wales. The RAAF's maritime patrol aircraft are based at RAAF Base Edinburgh near Adelaide and most of its transport aircraft are based at RAAF Base Richmond in Sydney. RAAF Base Edinburgh is also home to the control centre for the Jindalee Operational Radar Network. Most of the RAAF's training aircraft are based at RAAF Base Pearce near Perth with the remaining aircraft located at RAAF Base East Sale near Sale, Victoria, and RAAF Base Williamtown. The RAAF also maintains a network of bases in northern Australia to support operations to Australia's north. These bases include RAAF Base Darwin and RAAF Base Townsville and three 'bare bases' in Queensland and Western Australia. Of the RAAF's operational bases, only Tindal is located near an area in which the service's aircraft might feasibly see combat. While this protects the majority of the RAAF's assets from air attack, most air bases are poorly defended and aircraft are generally hangared in un-hardened shelters.

Domestic responsibilities

In addition to its military role, the ADF contributes to domestic security as well as disaster relief efforts in Australia and overseas. These functions are primarily the responsibility of civilian agencies, and the ADF's role in them requires specific justification and authorisation.

Elements of the ADF are frequently "called out" to contribute to relief efforts following natural disasters in Australia or overseas. The ADF's role in these efforts is set out in Australia's emergency management plans. The ADF typically contributes specialist capabilities, such as engineers or transport, to support the civil authorities. For major disasters, this can involve a large-scale deployment of personnel and assets. While the ADF has a commitment to assist relief efforts, several defence white papers have specified that this is a secondary responsibility to the force's focus on maintaining combat capabilities. As a result, requests for assistance have to be balanced against military priorities. No elements of the ADF are specifically tasked with or equipped for disaster relief efforts.

The ADF can also be tasked with providing aid to civil authorities outside of natural disasters; for instance in response to industrial action or to assist civilian police maintain law and order. This rarely occurs, however, and most Australians consider the use of military personnel to break strikes or undertake law enforcement to be inappropriate. Due to the political sensitivities associated with strike breaking, the ADF conducts little planning or other preparations for this role and the Defence Act explicitly states that reservists may not be called out or deployed in response to industrial action.

Over recent years, the ADF has been frequently committed to disaster relief. This has included deployments of large numbers of personnel to support fire fighting efforts during the 2019–20 Australian bushfire season and to assist state police and healthcare services during the COVID-19 pandemic. The scale of these deployments and the disruption they have caused to military training has led to suggestions that either elements of the Army Reserve be dedicated to disaster relief or a separate civilian organisation be established to take on the duties the ADF is undertaking.

The ADF makes a significant contribution to Australia's domestic maritime security. ADF ships, aircraft and Regional Force Surveillance Units conduct patrols of northern Australia in conjunction with the Australian Border Force (ABF). This operation, which is code-named Operation Resolute, is commanded by the Maritime Border Command which is jointly manned by members of the ADF and ABF. This operation involves a considerable proportion of the ADF's assets, with the forces assigned typically including two major naval vessels, multiple patrol boats, Regional Force Surveillance Unit patrols and AP-3 Orion aircraft. The ADF also often contributes to search and rescue efforts coordinated by the Australian Maritime Safety Authority and other civilian agencies.

While the ADF does not have a significant nation-building role, it provides assistance to remote Indigenous Australian communities through the Army Aboriginal Community Assistance Program. Under this program, which has been conducted since 1997, an engineer squadron works with one community for several months each year to upgrade local infrastructure and provide training. The ADF also took part in the intervention in remote Northern Territory Indigenous communities between June 2007 and October 2008. During this operation more than 600 ADF personnel provided logistical support to the Northern Territory Emergency Response Task Force and helped conduct child health checks.

The ADF shares responsibility for counter-terrorism with civilian law enforcement agencies. Under Australia's Counter-Terrorism Strategy, the state and territory police and emergency services have the primary responsibility for responding to any terrorist incidents on Australian territory. If a terrorist threat or the consequences of an incident are beyond the capacity of civilian authorities to resolve, the ADF may be called out to provide support following a request from the relevant state or territory government. The Commonwealth Government has responsibility for responding to offshore terrorist incidents. ADF liaison officers are posted to civilian law enforcement agencies, and the military offers specialised training to police counter-terrorism teams. To meet its counter-terrorism responsibilities the ADF maintains two elite Tactical Assault Groups, the Special Operations Engineer Regiment as well as a company-sized high readiness group in each Army Reserve brigade and the 1st Commando Regiment. ADF intelligence assets also work with other Australian Government and police agencies to counter foreign terrorist threats. While these forces provide a substantial counter-terrorism capability, the ADF does not regard domestic security as being part of its 'core business'.

Foreign defence relations

The Australian Defence Force cooperates with militaries around the world. Australia's formal military agreements include the ANZUS Alliance with the United States, the Closer Defence Program with New Zealand, the Five Power Defence Arrangements with Malaysia, Singapore, New Zealand and the United Kingdom, and the ABCA Armies Standardisation Program with the United States, the United Kingdom, Canada and New Zealand. Australia has also established a partnership with NATO. ADF activities under these agreements include participating in joint planning, intelligence sharing, personnel exchanges, equipment standardisation programs and joint exercises. Australia is also a member of the UKUSA signals intelligence gathering agreement. Members of the ADF are posted to Australian diplomatic missions around the world as defence attachés; in 2016 the role of these officers was expanded to include promoting export sales for the Australian defence industry. The 2016 Defence White Paper stated that the Government will seek to further expand the ADF's international engagement.

New Zealand, Singapore and the United States maintain military units in Australia. The New Zealand and Singaporean forces are limited to small training units at ADF bases, with the New Zealand contingent comprising nine personnel involved in air navigation training. Two Republic of Singapore Air Force pilot training squadrons with a total of 230 personnel are based in Australia; 126 Squadron at the Oakey Army Aviation Centre and 130 Squadron at RAAF Base Pearce. The Singapore Armed Forces also uses the Shoalwater Bay Military Training Area in Queensland for large-scale exercises; under the terms of a bilateral agreement, these run for up to 18 weeks each year and involve as many as 14,000 Singaporean personnel.

The United States maintains intelligence facilities in Australia, and regularly rotates military forces to the country for training purposes. The intelligence facilities comprise the Pine Gap satellite tracking station near Alice Springs and Naval Communication Station Harold E. Holt near Exmouth, Western Australia. Pine Gap is jointly operated by Australian and United States personnel and Naval Communication Station Harold E. Holt has been an exclusively Australian-operated facility since 1999. In early 2007 the Australian Government approved the construction of a new US communications installation at the Defence Signals Directorate Australian Defence Satellite Communications Station facility near Geraldton, Western Australia, to provide a ground station for the US-led Wideband Global System which Australia is partly funding. The United States Military also frequently uses Australian exercise areas and these facilities have been upgraded to support joint Australian-United States training. As well as these facilities, between 200 and 300 US Military personnel are posted to Australia to liaise with the ADF. In November 2011, the Australian and American Governments announced plans to base on rotational basis a United States Marine Corps Marine Air-Ground Task Force in the Northern Territory for training and exercise purposes and also plans to increase rotations of United States Air Force (USAF) aircraft through northern Australia. As part of this agreement, the Marine Rotational Force – Darwin has been deployed to Australia for six months each year since 2012. It is planned for this force to eventually comprise around 2,500 personnel with supporting aircraft and equipment. The expanded rotations of USAF units to Australia began in early 2017.

The ADF provides assistance to militaries in Australia's region through the Defence Cooperation Program. Under this program the ADF provides assistance with training, infrastructure, equipment and logistics and participates in joint exercises with countries in South East Asia and Oceania. The Pacific Patrol Boat Program is the largest Defence Cooperation Program activity and supports 22 Pacific class patrol boats operated by twelve South Pacific countries. Other important activities include supporting the development of the Timor Leste Defence Force and Papua New Guinea Defence Force and supplying watercraft to the Armed Forces of the Philippines. Australia also directly contributes to the defence of Pacific countries by periodically deploying warships and aircraft to patrol their territorial waters; this includes an annual deployment of RAAF AP-3 Orions to the region as part of a multi-national maritime surveillance operation. Under an informal agreement Australia is responsible for the defence of Nauru.

See also 

 List of military equipment of Australia
Defence Space Command

References

Notes

Citations

Works consulted

External links

  of the Australian Defence Organisation

 
1901 establishments in Australia
Military units and formations established in 1901
Leadership of the Australian Defence Force